The Mukurumudzi Dam is the primary water source for the Kwale Mineral Sands Project which mines titanium and zircon minerals from the dunes in the area south of Mombasa, Kenya.  The Kwale Project is operated by the Australian mining company, Base Resources, and is located 10 kilometres inland from the Kenyan coast and 50 kilometres south of Mombasa, Kenya's principal port facility.

Design and construction management for the dam was undertaken by Wave International Pty Ltd in association with ARQ. Construction of the dam started in January 2012 with completion in August 2013, and was undertaken by a local Kenya Civil Contractor, Hayer Bishan Singh & Sons Ltd.

Design 
The Mukurumudzi Dam is a 24m high homogeneous earthfill dam, with a low permeability central core and cut-off key and grout curtain, to limit seepage under the dam. The outlet works comprise a reinforced concrete intake tower and a reinforced concrete draw-off culvert and associated pipe work.

Due to a lack of suitable clay materials in the area, an impermeable central bentonite-cement-soil cut-off membrane was constructed successively with the embankment. The spillway discharges into the Mukurumudzi River. The dam impounds some 8.4 x 106 m³ at full supply level and has a catchment area of 133 km².

The dam supply is supplemented from the Gongoni borefield when water levels drop below .

References

Dams in Kenya